= 1902 Swiss schools referendum =

Referendum in Switzerland

| 15 March 1903 |
- Federal decree regarding the support of the public primary school by the federal government

Results
| Choice | Votes | % |
|---|---|---|
| Yes | 258,567 | 76.27% |
| No | 80,429 | 23.73% |
| Valid votes | 338,996 | 95.98% |
| Invalid or blank votes | 14,181 | 4.02% |
| Total votes | 353,177 | 100.00% |
| Registered voters/turnout | 757,320 | 46.64% |

A referendum on schools was held in Switzerland on 15 March 1903. Voters were asked whether they approved of a federal resolution on the federal government providing financial support for public elementary schools. It was approved by 76.3% of voters and a majority of cantons.

== Background ==
The referendum was an "obligatory referendum", which required a double majority; a majority of the popular vote and majority of the cantons. The decision of each canton was based on the vote in that canton. Full cantons counted as one vote, whilst half cantons counted as half.

== Results ==
| Choice | Popular vote | | Cantons | | |
| Choice | Votes | % | Full | Half | Total |
|---|---|---|---|---|---|
| For | 258,567 | 76.3 | 19 | 5 | 21.5 |
| Against | 80,429 | 23.7 | 0 | 1 | 0.5 |
| Blank votes | 12,449 | – | – | – | – |
| Invalid votes | 1,732 | – | – | – | – |
| Total | 353,177 | 100 | 19 | 6 | 22 |
| Registered voters/turnout | 757,320 | 46.6 | – | – | – |
Source: Nohlen & Stöver
